Milun Tesovic (born August 6, 1985) is a Canadian computer engineer, and was one of the youngest Internet entrepreneurs to sell his company to a major American media conglomerate.

Life
Born in Sarajevo, SR Bosnia and Herzegovina, SFR Yugoslavia, Tesovic emigrated to Canada with his father, mother and sister in 1994 during the Bosnian War. He has cited his immigrant background for making him self-motivated and hard working person.

At age 16, Milun created the online music website Metrolyrics which years later was sold to CBS in 2011.

Schooling
Milun finished his degree at Simon Fraser University completing his Bachelor of Business Administration in Entrepreneurship.

Honors and awards
 Billboard Top 30 Under 30

References

External links
 
 
 

1985 births
Living people
Businesspeople from Vancouver
Bosnia and Herzegovina emigrants to Canada
Canadian computer programmers
Canadian technology chief executives
Simon Fraser University alumni